Vladislav Gennadyevich Khakhalev (born 5 January 1966) is a former Russian professional football player.

Honours
 Russian Third League Zone 4 top scorer: 1996 (18 goals).

External links
 

1966 births
Living people
Soviet footballers
Russian footballers
Association football forwards
FC Asmaral Moscow players
Wydad AC players
Russian Premier League players
Russian expatriate footballers
Expatriate footballers in Morocco
FC Torpedo Vladimir players